Juho Paukku (born 19 July 1986) is a professional Finnish tennis player.  

Paukku reached his highest individual ranking on the ATP Tour on 17 January 2011, when he became world No. 379.  He primarily plays on the Futures circuit and the Challenger circuit.

Paukku has been a member of the Finland Davis Cup team since 2004,  posting a 2–8 record in singles and an 0–2 record in doubles in 8 ties.

Career titles

See also
List of Finland Davis Cup team representatives

References

External links
 
 
 

1986 births
Living people
Finnish male tennis players
Sportspeople from Helsinki